Pelagonemertes is a genus of pelagic nemertean belonging to the family Pelagonemertidae.

The species of this genus are found in almost all world oceans.

Species:

Pelagonemertes brinkmanni 
Pelagonemertes excisa 
Pelagonemertes joubini 
Pelagonemertes korotkevitschae 
Pelagonemertes laticauda 
Pelagonemertes moseleyi 
Pelagonemertes oviporus 
Pelagonemertes rollestoni

References

Nemerteans